Dominic Inglot and Franko Škugor were the defending champions, but Inglot decided to compete in Vienna instead. Škugor played alongside Nikola Mektić, but they lost to Jean-Julien Rojer and Horia Tecău in the first round.

Rojer and Tecău went on to win the title, defeating Taylor Fritz and Reilly Opelka in the final, 7–5, 6–3.

Seeds

Draw

Draw

Qualifying

Seeds

Qualifiers
  Santiago González /  Aisam-ul-Haq Qureshi

Qualifying draw

References

 Main Draw
 Qualifying Draw

Swiss Indoors - Doubles